Nine Miles Down is a 2009 horror film based on the Well to Hell hoax, a widespread urban myth (spread mostly in the 1990s) that Russian scientists had drilled so deep that they had broken through into hell and recorded the screams of the damned emanating from the borehole. It was the last feature film credit for writer Everett de Roche.  It is an international co-production between the UK, Hungary, and the US.

Plot
Thomas "Jack" Jackmann, an ex-policeman turned GNE security inspector, arrives at the Jevel Afra Drill site, a remote research station in the Central Sahara Desert during a sandstorm. None of the facility's 25 team members, led by Professor Borman, have been heard from in three days, so Jack is sent to check up on them. However, he instead finds the facility abandoned with signs of struggle, cryptic messages scrawled on the walls in Arabic with blood, and even the remains of a ritual where a jackal was skinned and sacrificed. He calls this in to his radio operator Kat at headquarters and sends photos of the writings to be translated. Unable to properly search the rest of the compound due to the storm, he investigates video recordings and discovers that the drill site was established by Borman to investigate a newly-detected air pocket nine miles below the surface. The scientists then began to exhibit signs of paranoia, causing Jack to also feel paranoid and experience a vivid hallucination while trying to sleep in his vehicle.

By morning, the storm has cleared and Jack searches the facility in earnest, meeting Dr. Jenny "JC" Christensen, seemingly the sole remaining member of the science team. She explains that Borman was murdered by the chief geologist and his body was stored in the refrigeration unit along with Dr. Varga who died of a heart attack. Jack calls in the deaths to GNE, but the police are tied up searching for the other missing scientists, and his boss Chief Caswell orders him to stay put in case anyone returns. JC, meanwhile, is anxious to leave, and Jack becomes suspicious, having not seen her in video or photos of the team. While he recovers from hitting his head on a crane hook, she attempts to steal his vehicle but he has hidden the keys on his person. A call from Kat then reveals that one of the doctors, Ivanoff, was found alive and that JC did not appear on the crew roster, although JC herself explains this with evidence that due to budget constraints not allowing segregated quarters, Borman falsified her name and gender.

JC recounts that, six days prior, the drill had broken through to the cavity and audio sensors on the drill picked up chilling audio of what sounded like human screams. Fearing they had broken through to Hell itself, the crew then began to hallucinate seeing dead loved ones, resulting in panic and even violent behavior. At this point, Jack has also begun to see things and act nervous. The two begin to develop a strong attraction to each other while watching the sunset over the desert and they share dinner to celebrate Jack's birthday. He then reveals the severe trauma he deals with after his wife Susan killed herself and their two children six years before over suspicions of him having an affair. Heartbroken, he quit working as a police officer and took the remote work in the desert to try and find peace with himself. To comfort him, Jack and JC sleep together, but his hallucinations worsen due to his resurfaced trauma.

In his nightmares, Jack begins to suspect that JC is not human and fears for his life and sanity. Arming himself, he discovers human remains in the site's cesspit and, in a panic, attacks JC in the shower. She tries to subdue him but Jack locks himself in Borman's office and finds a hidden recording of the Professor feverishly explaining that the Devil itself had been released, further convincing Jack that JC is dangerous. Finding her in the kitchen carving meat, her persona has become that of the Devil and convinces him to sell his soul. In reality, she is merely playing along with his delusions in a ploy to get his car keys so she can drive them to get help. Jack finds himself reliving the day of the murder-suicide and wounds JC with a screwdriver before setting the facility on fire. Just then a GNE rescue team arrives and subdues Jack, evacuating them both to a hospital via helicopter before the facility explodes.

Jack's superiors Caswell and Inspector Khaled later back up JC's story and presence on the expedition, explaining that the rescued Ivanoff had a sample of a kind of toxic gas released from the underground cavity by the drill. Inhalation of the gas caused the afflicted to lose the ability to differentiate between reality, memory, and imagination, causing irrational behavior in the scientists as well as Jack. JC, meanwhile, was less affected because her quarters were separate from the main compound. The remaining scientists are still missing and presumed dead, having scattered into the desert. Despite these revelations, Jack's paranoia about JC being the Devil quickly resurfaces, and he steals a handgun and tries to kill her before being stopped by his coworker Alex. His sanity truly broken, Jack finally gives in to his despair and the film ends as he commits suicide to the laughter of his dead wife.

Cast

Production
Val Kilmer was in talks to star in May 2002.  Production ended in May 2008.

Reception 
Mark L. Miller of Ain't It Cool News called it "a devilishly pleasant surprise" that fulfills its promising concept.

References

External links 
 
 

2009 films
2009 horror films
American horror films
British horror films
Hungarian horror films
English-language Hungarian films
Films based on urban legends
2000s English-language films
2000s American films
2000s British films